Callidula posticalis is a moth in the  family Callidulidae. It is found on New Ireland in Papua New Guinea, Dinesh Dhanai.

References

Callidulidae
Moths described in 1831